Naughty Jatts is a Punjabi romantic comedy film directed by Pankaj Batra and produced by Multiline Entertainment (Satish Katyal and Sandeep Bhalla). The film stars Aarya Babbar, Roshan Prince and Binnu Dhillon opposite Neeru Bajwa. It was released to theaters on 2 August 2013.

Satish Katyal has recently launched its own music company in name of FH Musics.

Cast
 Neeru Bajwa as Simi Khehra
 Binnu Dhillon as Laali
 Arya Babbar as Rocky Deol
 Roshan Prince as Balwinder Deol / Beedi
 B. N. Sharma as Simi's Father
 Karamjit Anmol as Jeeta
 Kanwalpreet Singh
 Harby Sangha as Blind Beggar

Soundtrack

The soundtrack of Naughty Jatts consists of 11 songs composed by G-Deep, Anil Sagar, Sham Balkar and Jaggi Singh.

References

External links
Official website
Official Facebook page

2013 films
Punjabi-language Indian films
2010s Punjabi-language films
Films directed by Pankaj Batra